Sugar Creek is a stream in the U.S. state of Ohio. It is a tributary of the Ottawa River (Auglaize River).

Sugar Creek was named for the sugar maple trees which once grew in abundance along its course.

See also
List of rivers of Ohio

References

Rivers of Allen County, Ohio
Rivers of Putnam County, Ohio
Rivers of Ohio